Shannon Kumar Sanu, better known by Shannon K, is an Indian–American singer-songwriter.

Career 
Shannon K released her first American collaboration for the song "A Long Time" (2018) with Poo Bear. The music video for the song has received over 41,000,000 views on YouTube.

She collaborated with music producer Kyle Townsend for the anti-bullying song "Give Me Your Hand". The song was premiered by Billboard magazine. The song was co-written with Annabel, Shannon K's younger sister, in support of the anti-bullying charity Love is Louder, which is part of The Jed Foundation. Shannon stated that she suffered from bullying while growing up so she continues to support this cause.

Shannon has collaborated with Bollywood singer Sonu Nigam, and released the love song "OMT" in November 2018.

Shannon co-wrote the song "It’s Magical" with Sameer

Shannon is also the Executive Director for the movie Social Mandiya,

References

External links 
 

American women singer-songwriters
Indian emigrants to the United States
Living people
American singer-songwriters
Year of birth missing (living people)